Arbon Valley is a census-designated place (CDP) in Power County, Idaho, in the United States. As of the 2010 census, the CDP population was 599. It lies within the Fort Hall Indian Reservation, just west of the city of Pocatello.

History
The valley in which Arbon Valley is located was named after George Nicholas Arbon, an early settler.

Geography
Arbon Valley is located at  (42.891629, -112.608711).

Climate
According to the Köppen Climate Classification system, Arbon Valley has a semi-arid climate, abbreviated "BSk" on climate maps.

Demographics

As of the census of 2000, there were 627 people, 224 households, and 180 families residing in the CDP.  The population density was 18.4 people per square mile (7.1/km2).  There were 241 housing units at an average density of 7.1/sq mi (2.7/km2).  The racial makeup of the CDP was 87.40% White, 0.16% African American, 4.63% Native American, 0.80% Asian, 4.78% from other races, and 2.23% from two or more races. Hispanic or Latino of any race were 10.37% of the population.

There were 224 households, out of which 37.9% had children under the age of 18 living with them, 68.8% were married couples living together, 5.4% had a female householder with no husband present, and 19.6% were non-families. 15.6% of all households were made up of individuals, and 4.5% had someone living alone who was 65 years of age or older.  The average household size was 2.79 and the average family size was 3.08.

In the CDP, the population was spread out, with 28.4% under the age of 18, 9.1% from 18 to 24, 25.5% from 25 to 44, 30.5% from 45 to 64, and 6.5% who were 65 years of age or older.  The median age was 36 years. For every 100 females, there were 111.1 males.  For every 100 females age 18 and over, there were 111.8 males.

The median income for a household in the CDP was $36,818, and the median income for a family was $39,500. Males had a median income of $31,484 versus $17,500 for females. The per capita income for the CDP was $13,646.  About 8.0% of families and 13.5% of the population were below the poverty line, including 21.6% of those under age 18 and 10.8% of those age 65 or over.

See also

 List of census-designated places in Idaho

References

External links

Census-designated places in Power County, Idaho
Pocatello, Idaho metropolitan area
Landforms of Power County, Idaho
Census-designated places in Idaho